Relex  may refer to:

 DG RELEX, a Directorate-General of the European Commission
 Operation Relex
 RELEX Group, the developer of Linter SQL RDBMS
 ReLEx SMILE, a type of laser surgery
 Relex Software, acquired by software company PTC
 Relex Solutions, a Finnish company that acquired Galleria Retail Technology Solutions

See also
 Relexification, a linguistic process
 RELX
 
 Reflex (disambiguation)